Milton Fabián Rodríguez Suárez (born April 28, 1976) is a Colombian footballer who currently plays for Cúcuta Deportivo.

Club career
Rodríguez began his professional career with Cortuluá in 1997. In two years at the club the left-footed striker scored 22 goals in 45 appearances. In 1999, he moved to Independiente Santa Fe and continued his goal scoring prowess netting 14 goals in 36 appearances. The following season he returned to Cortuluá and had another fine season scoring 10 goals in 21 matches. In 2000, he would embark on his first stint with top Colombian side Deportivo Cali but would have limited success scoring 3 goals in 21 matches. In 2001, he would rejoin Cortuluá for the third time in his career and would net 9 goals in 38 appearances. Rodríguez joined Deportivo Pereira for the second half of the 2002 season and would appear in 19 matches scoring a league leading 13 goals in the Torneo Finalización 2002.

For the next few years he would continue to move from club to club playing with Independiente Santa Fe and Deportivo Cali before returning to Deportivo Pereira during the 2004 season. While with Pereira he would regain his scoring prowess netting 12 goals in 17 matches. As a result of his play with Pereira, he would rejoin Deportivo Cali and would go on to one of the most successful stints in his career scoring 27 goals in 42 matches.

In 2005, he would leave Colombia for the first time in his career and join K-League side Jeonbuk Hyundai Motors. While with Jeonbuk Hyundai Motors the Colombian striker had instant success and was regarded as a very exciting player. The following season he moved to the Newcastle Jets, who signed him a few days before the start of the 2006-07 season from K-League outfit Jeonbuk Hyundai Motors. He arrived in Newcastle ready to make his debut in Round 4 after Visa issues prevented him and his family from entering the country. Rodríguez capped his debut for the Newcastle Jets by coming on as a substitute and scoring two goals in ten minutes making him an instant fan-favorite. During this time his trademark headband became one of his most identifiable features.

He would make his return to Colombian during the 2007 season with América de Cali and would go on to score 6 goals in 11 matches. After a brief stay with América, Rodríguez would join city rival Deportivo Cali for the fourth time in his career and remain there for one season. In 2008, he would join another historical Colombian side Millonarios where he would score 11 goals in 33 matches. The following seasons he would play for Deportes Tolima and Real Cartagena and continue to score goals at a regular rate.

In 2010, he was contacted by Major League Soccer side FC Dallas and agreed to join the club in mid-season. In his first season Rodríguez would score several key goals in helping his club to reach the 2010 MLS Cup final.

Rodriguez scored Dallas's first goal of the 2011 season with a between the legs left footed shot against the Chicago Fire Soccer Club off a cross from Zach Loyd. However, he struggled for playing time and goals for most of 2011 and was released by Dallas on July 28, 2011.

International career
Rodríguez has three full international caps for Colombia. Making his debut with the national team in 2004.

Honours

Club

Jeonbuk Hyundai Mortors
FA Cup (1): 2005

FC Dallas
Major League Soccer Western Conference Championship (1): 2010

Individual
Korean FA Cup MVP Award (1): 2005
Korean FA Cup Top Scorer Award (1): 2005

References

External links
 
 
 
 

1976 births
Living people
Footballers from Cali
Association football forwards
Colombian footballers
Colombia international footballers
Cortuluá footballers
Independiente Santa Fe footballers
Deportivo Cali footballers
Deportivo Pereira footballers
Jeonbuk Hyundai Motors players
Newcastle Jets FC players
América de Cali footballers
Millonarios F.C. players
Deportes Tolima footballers
Real Cartagena footballers
FC Dallas players
Atlético Huila footballers
Envigado F.C. players
Cúcuta Deportivo footballers
Categoría Primera A players
K League 1 players
A-League Men players
Expatriate footballers in South Korea
Expatriate soccer players in Australia
Colombian expatriate footballers
Colombian expatriate sportspeople in South Korea
Expatriate soccer players in the United States
Major League Soccer players